Saint-Mars-sous-Ballon (literally Saint-Mars under Ballon) is a former commune in the Sarthe department in the region of Pays de la Loire in north-western France. On 1 January 2016, it was merged into the new commune of Ballon-Saint-Mars. Its population was 871 in 2018.

See also
Communes of the Sarthe department

References

Former communes of Sarthe